Abalakovo is a rural locality (a village) in Malinovskoye Rural Settlement of Sayansky District, Krasnoyarsk Krai, Russia. The population was 51 as of 2010. There are 4 streets. in 1964 Abalakovo was inhabited mainly by Russians and Ukrainians and by some Tatars and Kamasins. The last Kamassian native speaker (Klavdya Plotnikova) also lived in Abalakovo.

Geography 
Abalakovo is located 30 km south of Aginskoye (the district's administrative centre) by road. Voznesenka is the nearest rural locality.

References 

Rural localities in Krasnoyarsk Krai
Sayansky District